Nataša Erjavec (born 15 May 1968) is a retired Slovenian athlete who specialised in the shot put. She represented her country at one indoor and two outdoor World Championships. In addition, she won the silver at the 1993 Mediterranean Games.

Her personal bests in the event are 18.10 metres outdoors (Nova Gorica 1994) and 17.97 metres indoors (Ljubljana 1996). Both are standing national records.

Competition record

References

1968 births
Living people
Slovenian female shot putters
World Athletics Championships athletes for Slovenia
Mediterranean Games silver medalists for Slovenia
Mediterranean Games medalists in athletics
Athletes (track and field) at the 1993 Mediterranean Games
Athletes (track and field) at the 1997 Mediterranean Games
Competitors at the 1995 Summer Universiade